Dr Frans Vera (born Franciscus Wilhelmus Maria Vera; Amsterdam, 4 June 1949) is a Dutch biologist and conservationist. He has played a key part in devising the current ecological strategy for the Netherlands. He has hypothesised that Western European primeval forests at the end of the Pleistocene epoch did not consist only of "closed-canopy" high-forest conditions, but also included pastures combined with forests, a hypothesis variously addressed as the Vera hypothesis or the wood-pasture hypothesis.

Biography 
His teacher at primary school also stimulated his interest in nature. At high school he worked with Paul Opdam (born 1949) to search in the Utrechtse Heuvelrug moraine for the few remaining nests of the goshawk. He came into contact with Maarten Bijleveld, who initiated  ("Operation Goshawk") at that time, and with H.J. Slijper, the falconer and painter.

From 1970 to 1978 Vera studied biology at the VU University Amsterdam (VU) in Amsterdam. Here he was influenced by Prof. Lambertus Vlijm, animal ecologist. In 1979 he joined the Inspectie Natuurbehoud (Inspectorate for Nature Conservation) of the Staatsbosbeheer, the Dutch state organisation for forestry and management of nature reserves, where he worked on "valuable agricultural cultural landscapes", and later on natural development in large natural areas and areas of water. In 1982 he moved to the Ministerie van Landbouw, Natuurbeheer en Visserij, the then Ministry of Agriculture, Nature Management and Fisheries, where he became head of the department for Natural Development and Large Natural Areas. In 1988 he co-authored an Exploratory Study of Natural Development, which presented the concept of the "ecological main structure" (or EHS), which was subsequently incorporated into the Ministry's 1989 Nature Policy Plan.

In 1989, Vera moved to the Faculty of Nature Management at Landbouwuniversiteit Wageningen (now Wageningen University & Research (WUR) where he received his PhD in 1997, after completing his thesis  ("Wilderness metaphors. Oak, hazel, cattle and horse"), on the appearance of the vegetation in the lowlands of Central and Western Europe after the end of the last ice age, early in the current Holocene epoch. An adapted version of his thesis was published in 2000 as  Grazing Ecology and Forest History.

He has also worked as director of the Stichting Natuurlijke Processen (Natural Processes Foundation), University of Groningen, as a guest staff member at the University of Groningen's Centre for Ecological and Evolutionary Studies (CEES), and as Senior Policy Adviser to the Strategic Policies Division at the Minister's Office in The Hague. He retired in June 2014, but still works as scientist and policy adviser.

Hypothesis 

Vera has hypothesised that in the primeval landscape of lowland Europe large herbivores maintained an open landscape. He has argued that as a result European primeval forests were not closed-canopy, i.e. with dense growth of trees in which the top branches and leaves form a ceiling, or canopy, so that light can barely penetrate to reach the forest floor, resulting in reduced vegetation growing under and between the mature trees, leaving the ground mostly free of brush.

His book Grazing Ecology and Forest History challenges views on the nature of the former natural landscape. Vera argues that, if the ancient natural forest were to consist only of closed-canopy conditions, then the light demanding tree species would not be as  well represented in the fossil record as they are. He proposes a semi-open landscape for the lowlands of Central and Western Europe of c.7,000 years ago, and that large herbivores produced a shifting mosaic of vegetation. Others have  suggested that fire and windthrow may also have had important roles.

Oostvaardersplassen Nature Reserve 

Vera has played a significant part in the nature conservation project to develop the Oostvaardersplassen nature reserve in southern Flevoland, which was reclaimed in 1967.

Initially, part of the polder was intended for industrial development, but once the land was reclaimed, the need for land for industry had diminished. An area of thousands of hectares remained uncultivated along the Oostvaardersdijk, and that area quickly developed into a site with great natural wealth and potential. On 6 September 1973, Prof. H.J. van Duin, head of the Scientific Department of the then Rijksdienst voor de IJsselmeerpolders (National Institute for Polders, or R.IJ.P.) suggested in an interview that attention should be paid to the area that was then called “the Knar reserve”. In 1979 Dr. E.P.R. Poorter, biologist at the R.IJ.P., wrote about the Oostvaardersplassen in De Lepelaar ("The Spoonbill"), the journal of the Vogelbescherming Nederland (the Netherlands Society for the Protection of Birds).

Vera had been privately involved in activities to safeguard and develop Oostvaardersplassen, and Poorter's article prompted him to take action. He wrote an article for the magazine  ("Nature and Environment") to draw attention to the fact that the area did not have any protected status. When Vera joined the Staatsbosbeheer shortly afterwards, he was able to make an official effort to protect the area. A short time later, after a report from Vera and pressure from the Natuur & Milieu environmental organisation, from Vogelbescherming Nederland, and from the action group Redt de Oostvaardersplassen (Save the Oostvaardersplassen), the nature reserve was designated as a natural monument and the railway line between Almere and Lelystad was rerouted, so that the reserve was not divided.

In 1986, more than 5,700 hectares were brought within the protection of the Nature Conservation Act, an area approximately 10 km long and 6 km wide. Vera proposed the reserve should develop by natural processes, and nature allowed to take its course. Greylag geese had been breeding in the Oostvaardersplassen from 1970 onwards, and moulted in large numbers in the spring (in 1987 more than 30,000 moulting greylag geese were counted),  Grazing of these geese in the marshy part, in combination with a dynamic water table, prevented the wetlands from becoming overgrown and therefore conserved many protected bird species.

Vera then proposed the next step, the introduction of large herbivorous mammals to the reserve as proxy species in order to recreate a grassland ecology and keep the higher, drier, parts of the new nature reserve clear. Large grazers such as Heck cattle, wild horses, Koniks horses, and red deer have been used to maintain the natural dynamics in the Oostvaardersplassen. The animals are kept behind a fence and cannot migrate.

The management of the reserve based on "natural processes" has led to high mortality rates of large herbivores, many of which die naturally from starvation, resulting in crticism from media and politicians and occasional public protests. The experiment is considered scientifically controversial due to the lack of predators and other native megafauna such as wolves, bears, lynx, elk, boar, and wisent.

Influence 
Vera and others started a new approach to Dutch nature conservation in the 1980s, and the current ecological strategy for the Netherlands is partly derived from his work at Oostvaardersplassen, striving for a varied but especially more "natural" environment, in which certain natural processes are given more space. Together with five colleagues Vera authored the Plan Ooievaar ("Stork Plan"), which proposed restoring natural processes such as flooding the floodplains of big rivers. This plan has been one of the foundations of the Nature Development policy of the Ministry of Agriculture, Nature and Food Quality (LNV), especially in relation to the development of nature along the great rivers in the Netherlands.

Although his theory about large grazers in the original European landscape, and the operation of the Oostvaardersplassen Nature Reserve, remains controversial, he has had great influence. His key work is the 1997 thesis  ("Metaphors for the Wilderness"), of which an adapted English version was published in 2000 entitled Grazing Ecology and Forest History.

The greatest impact of Vera's hypothesis is that some ecologists now believe the key principle of "rewilding" should be to change conservation away from preservation and towards the restoration of natural processes, by letting the landscape with its plants and animals run wild. Traditionally, it was expected that this approach would result in dense forest, and a mass extinction of wild flowers and butterflies requiring sunlight. The experiment at  Oostvaardersplassen has shown that “natural” grazing can create a more dynamic landscape  of open glades and wooded groves.

Vera’s views have been used as the partial basis for several projects, such as those at Oostvaardersplassen, at Knepp Wildland in England, and for the Rewilding Britain organisation.

Awards 

Publications 

Publications by Vera include:
 
 
 
 
 
  According to Voous (1995, p. 514) “a masterpiece of thorough observation and courageous management vision”.
 
 
  (adapted English version of )

References

Sources

Further reading

External links
 Oostvaardersplassen  at the website of Staatsbosbeheer
 Knepp Wildland Project
 Rewilding Britain
 A talk by Frans Vera: The search for Wilderness needs Wilderness in the mind
 A talk by Frans Vera: Freeing the Landscape - grazing animals as ecosystems engineers

Living people
1949 births
Dutch biologists
Conservationists
Dutch conservationists
Dutch ecologists
Rewilding advocates
Vrije Universiteit Amsterdam alumni
Academic staff of Wageningen University and Research
Academic staff of the University of Groningen